Karaoke is a 1996 British television drama written by Dennis Potter with the knowledge that he was dying from cancer of the pancreas.

It forms the first half of a pair with the serial Cold Lazarus. The two plays were filmed as a single production by the same team; both were directed by Renny Rye. The series was said to be inspired by Potter's working relationship with Louise Germaine.

The plays were a co-production between the BBC and rival broadcaster Channel 4, a unique arrangement Potter had expressly requested before his death. The show was first aired on BBC1 in April 1996 on Sunday evenings, with a repeat on Channel 4 the following day.

The series stars Albert Finney, Richard E. Grant, Hywel Bennett, Roy Hudd and Julie Christie and features Saffron Burrows and Keeley Hawes in two early screen appearances.

Cast 

 Albert Finney as Daniel Feeld
 Hywel Bennett as Arthur 'Pig' Mailion
 Roy Hudd as Ben Baglin 
 Anna Chancellor as Anna Griffiths
 Saffron Burrows as Sandra Sollars
 Richard E. Grant as Nick Balmer
 Keeley Hawes as Linda Langer
 Ian McDiarmid as Oliver Morse
 Natasha McElhone as Angie
 Julie Christie as Lady Balmer
 Fay Ripley as Club Barmaid
 Simon Donald as Ian
 Liz Smith as Mrs. Baglin
 Alison Steadman as Mrs. Haynes
 Neil Stuke as Peter
 Stephen Boxer as Consultant
 Ewan McGregor as Young Man
 Matthew Cottle as Hospital Doctor
 Ralph Brown as Peter Beasley

Plot
The principal character of Karaoke is Daniel Feeld (played by Albert Finney), an English playwright in late middle-age who is working on the television production of his latest play, itself entitled Karaoke. The play concerns the relationship between a young woman, Sandra Sollars, her boyfriend Peter Beasley and Arthur 'Pig' Mailion, the owner of the sleazy karaoke/hostess bar where Sandra works.

One evening, while sitting in a restaurant, Feeld becomes convinced that a couple at a nearby table who resemble the fictional Sandra and Peter are repeating lines of dialogue from the play. Daniel later encounters the young woman (Saffron Burrows) and discovers that her name is indeed Sandra, and that she works in a club owned by one Arthur Mailion (Hywel Bennett). He relates the coincidence to a frightened Sandra, who runs away, leaving behind her handbag. Daniel subsequently relates the story to his agent Ben Baglin (Roy Hudd) and producer Anna Griffiths (Anna Chancellor), who assume that Daniel's apparent paranoia is due to his worsening health through heavy drinking and smoking.

Daniel discovers a small pistol and a credit card in Sandra's handbag. After using the card to determine her address, he visits her home in order to return the bag, but first removes the pistol. He discovers that Sandra was carrying the pistol because of her intention to avenge a savage attack on her mother (Alison Steadman) carried out by Mailion years earlier. Disturbed by the possibility that the death of the fictional Sandra in his play may come true in real life, Daniel decides to change his play. Meanwhile, having also discovered the existence of the real Mailion, Anna discusses with the play's director, Nick Balmer (Richard E. Grant) the possibility of changing Mailion's name in order to avoid litigation.

Nick has been conducting an affair with Linda Langer (Keeley Hawes), the actress who plays Sandra in the film version of Karaoke, but is also the intended victim of a blackmail plot hatched by Linda and Mailion. He dismisses the attempt, is beaten up by Mailion's thugs, and confesses all to his wife, Lady Balmer (Julie Christie), with whom he is reconciled.

Daniel is admitted to hospital and told he has only weeks to live. He changes his will, leaving his body to an experimental cryogenics laboratory, and offering a generous portion of his estate to Sandra and her mother, on the condition that Sandra ceases working at the club and renounces her intention to kill Mailion. Sandra agrees, but Daniel remains uneasy about her intentions.

One night, he leaves the hospital, taking the pistol with him, and visits Mailion's club, where he performs a striking version of "Pennies from Heaven" before shooting Mailion dead in his office and arranging an alibi with the unsuspecting Baglin to cover up the murder.

References

External links
 

1996 British television series debuts
1996 British television series endings
1990s British drama television series
1990s British television miniseries
BBC television dramas
Channel 4 original programming
Television series produced at Pinewood Studios
Television shows written by Dennis Potter
English-language television shows
Cryonics in fiction